Eardley may refer to:

Eardley (name)
Eardley, Quebec
Eardley baronets, a title in the Baronetage of the United Kingdom